Lismer is a crater on Mercury. Its name was adopted by the International Astronomical Union (IAU) on April 24, 2012. Lismer is named for the English-Canadian painter Arthur Lismer.

Lismer is joined to the southwest to the larger but similar crater Henri.

References

Impact craters on Mercury